Coronation Park is a park and veteran's memorial in Toronto, Ontario, Canada. Coronation Park was built to honour the coronation of King George VI in 1937. Trees are planted to honour the Canadian men and women who participated in World War I and earlier wars. Built during the Great Depression, the construction used many workers on relief. It is constructed on landfill on the shore of Lake Ontario. The park also has the Victory-Peace World War II monument located at water's edge. To the east is HMCS York, the naval barracks. To the north is Fort York and the Fort York Armoury. To the west is Exhibition Place, once the site of New Fort York.

Construction
In 1934, Toronto was suffering through the Great Depression, with 23% of the population on relief. The Toronto Harbour Commission regularly dredged the bottom of Toronto Harbour to keep it at navigation depth. The City would take possession of the new land for park purposes. The  ($ in  dollars) project was approved by the City of Toronto Board of Control in December 1934.

Construction began in the spring of 1935. One of the objectives of the project was to provide work to unemployed workers on welfare. Seventy-five per cent of the workers were registered with the Department of Public Welfare. The park's construction was hard labour. While steam shovels did the dredging, the soil was moved wheelbarrow by wheelbarrow. One worker collapsed and three horses died.

The park was completed in time for the planting of trees on May 12, 1937, Coronation Day, a public holiday in Toronto. One year later on August 1, as part of a large reunion of veterans, each tree had a granite stone and plaque installed next to it. Each plaque described the regiment the tree represented. The plaque for the Royal Oak, planted by Justice John A. Hope, was unveiled by Sir William Mulock (former Chief Justice of the Supreme Court of Ontario). Veterans also donated park benches to the park in 1938.

Another tree planting occurred with the 1939 royal tour of Canada by King George VI and Queen Elizabeth. A tree was planted for every public and separate school in Toronto. 123 maples were planted along Remembrance Drive, each tree planted while the Royal car passed by. Another 20 trees were planted on the occasion of the 2010 G20 Toronto summit.

Design

The park has trees planted for each regiment of the Canadian Expeditionary Forces in World War I, and one for the King (called the "King's Oak"). The idea for a commemorative planting of trees was developed by F. E. Robson of Men of the Trees and Thomas Hobbs and Andrew Gillespie of the Toronto Ex-Serviceman's Coronation Committee. The idea was approved by Toronto Board of Control and the Coronation Park Advisory Committee supervised details of the plantings. Hobbs died in service in 1940 and a small cairn in his memory was placed in the park.

The design consisted of grouping trees around a central Royal Oak, symbolizing the King. An inner ring of oak trees, known as the "Empire Circle", represents the United Kingdom, Canada, Australia, New Zealand, India, South Africa and the Crown Colonies. To the north, the Imperial Service triangle of trees represented the Royal Navy, Air Force and Army. On either side of the ring are separate groves of maple trees representing the 1st, 2nd, 3rd and 4th Canadian divisions, Siberian troops, and Corp Troops to the east and west. The Corps Troops trees included trees commemorating Canadian nursing sisters and veterans of the Second Boer War, the 1885 rebellion, and the Fenian Raids of 1866. A total of 144 trees were donated by the Toronto Chapter of Men of the Trees.

Victory-Peace Monument

At water's edge, a permanent war memorial was built in 1995, the 50th anniversary of the end of World War II. It is situated in a small clearing south of the trees. Known as the "Victory-Peace Monument" it was erected by the World War II 50th Anniversary Memorial Tribute Committee. The memorial is in a circle of concrete on the ground. In the center of the circle is a brass disk  in diameter with the words "1939 1945 PEACE" inscribed and the word peace etched into the disk in other languages. The circle is bounded by a rim of concrete steps. Each block is etched with words or artwork relevant to the war. There are two sets of bronze walls, arranged like ship prows. Between the walls are maple leaves. One is engraved "Sacrifice". The walls surrounding it has artwork depicting information about Canada's involvement in World War II. The monument was designed by artist John McEwan. It was dedicated by Canadian Governor-General Romeo LeBlanc on November 14, 1995.

Just to the east is a tall flagpole with a "victory garden" planted around it.

Park

The park has three ball diamonds which are used during non-winter months for informal softball and baseball leagues. During the Canadian National Exhibition (CNE), the diamonds are used for the CNE Lions Club Pee-Wee Tournament for youth players. During the winter, an outdoor ice rick is built at the park. It is also used informally for ice hockey. The park also has a dog off-leash area and a clubhouse. Between two of the diamonds is Coronation Park Pavilion, built in 1995, which has washrooms, lockers and showers for the users of the diamonds.

Remembrance Drive extends through the park, along the northern boundary of the tree groves. The Martin Goodman Trail extends through the park, along the water's edge.

History
The memorial park was twice threatened to be removed. During the planning stages of the Gardiner Expressway, it was proposed to move Old Fort York to Coronation Park. This was opposed by a coalition of veteran's groups and historical societies. A second occurred in 1971 when it was proposed to expand Exhibition Place, turning the park into a new location for the midway amusements and rides. Veterans' and labour organizations successfully stopped the proposal.

The memorial was rededicated on November 10, 2018 on the 100th-year anniversary of the end of World War I. It was rededicated by Ontario Lieutenant-Governor Elizabeth Dowdeswell, Toronto Mayor John Tory and members of the Canadian Armed Forces. The memorial is being restored during 2018 and 2019 using funds from a Government of Canada program to refurbish cenotaphs and memorials country-wide, the City of Toronto and private sources. The first phase restored the area of the Royal Oak and the Empire Circle. Phase two during 2019 will restore the maple grove. The restoration project will restore pathways and add signage.

References

Bibliography
 
 
 

1937 establishments in Ontario
Parks in Toronto
Monuments and memorials in Toronto